Mystic Truth is the third studio album by indie rock band Bad Suns, released on Epitaph Records on March 22, 2019. It was supported with two singles: "Away We Go" and "Hold Your Fire". To promote the album, the band performed throughout the United States in the Away We Go Tour in 2019.

Reception

AllMusic gave the album three out of five stars with its review by James Christopher Monger praising several individual songs for stretching the band's songwriting and having a bright and uplifting attitude. Summing up, Monger says Mystic Truth "delivers another handful of meticulously polished gems that will be sure to find their way onto a future career overview or greatest-hits collection."

Track listing
"Away We Go" – 3:25
"One Magic Moment" – 3:37
"A Miracle, a Mile Away" – 3:29
"The World and I" – 2:52
"Love by Mistake" – 2:33
"Darkness Arrives (and Departs)" – 3:37
"Hold Your Fire" – 3:02
"Howling at the Sun" – 2:41
"Separate Seas" – 3:31
"Starjumper" – 4:02

Personnel
Bad Suns
Gavin Bennett – bass guitar, piano
Christo Bowman – guitar, vocals, keys, bass guitar on "A Miracle, A Mile Away"
Ray Libby – guitar
Miles Morris – drums, percussion

Additional personnel
Vanessa Freebaim-Smith - cello
Dave Sardy – production
Jim Monte - engineering, editing
Cameron Barton - engineering
Morgan Straton - assistant engineering

References

External links
Page from Bad Suns' site
Page from Epitaph Records

Interview with Pop Dust
Interview with Atwood Magazine

2019 albums
Albums produced by Dave Sardy
Bad Suns albums
Epitaph Records albums